Esmond James Lane (25 June 1929 – 28 May 2018) was an Australian rules footballer who played with South Melbourne in the VFL during the 1950s.

Lane was a 168 cm rover and handy goalkicker. His best season came in 1954 when he won the South Melbourne Best and Fairest award and finished equal 3rd in the Brownlow Medal. He topped the club's goal kicking in both 1954 and 1955.

References

External links

Eddie Lane photo

1929 births
2018 deaths
Australian rules footballers from Victoria (Australia)
Sydney Swans players
Bob Skilton Medal winners